The Catacomb of Priscilla is an archaeological site on the Via Salaria in Rome, Italy, situated in what was a quarry in Roman times. This quarry was used for Christian burials from the late 2nd century through the 4th century. This catacomb, according to tradition, is named after the wife of the Consul Manius Acilius Glabrio; he is said to have become a Christian and was killed on the orders of Domitian. Some of the walls and ceilings display fine decorations illustrating Biblical scenes.

The modern entrance to the catacomb is on the Via Salaria through the cloister of the monastery of the Benedictines of Priscilla. The Catacombs of Priscilla are divided into three principal areas: an arenarium, a cryptoporticus from a large Roman villa, and the underground burial area of the ancient Roman family, the Acilius Glabrio.

Artworks 
The wall paintings in this catacomb include images of saints and early Christian symbols, such as the painting reproduced in Giovanni Gaetano Bottari's folio of 1754, where the Good Shepherd is depicted as feeding the lambs, with a crowing cock on his right and left hand.  

Particularly notable is the "Greek Chapel" (Capella Greca), a square chamber with an arch which contains 3rd century frescoes generally interpreted to be Old and New Testament scenes, including the Fractio Panis. Above the apse is a Last Judgment. New, and somewhat controversial research has begun to suggest that the scenes traditionally interpreted as the deuterocanonical story of Susannah (Daniel 13) may actually be scenes from the life of a prestigious Christian woman of the 2nd century AD. Near this are figures of the Madonna and Child and the Prophet Isaiah, also dating from the early 3rd century.

The Priscilla catacombs may contain the oldest known Marian paintings, from the early third century. Mary is shown with Jesus on her lap, and the catacombs may have a depiction of the Annunciation, though the latter has been disputed.

Papal tombs

On account of the fact that seven early popes and many martyrs were buried in the cemetery, it was known as the "Queen of the Catacombs" in antiquity.  Two popes were buried in the Catacomb of Priscilla: Pope Marcellinus (296 - 304) and Pope Marcellus I (308 - 309). Their martyrdom was represented in the iconographies made by order of the Popes Damasus, Siricius, Celestine and Virgilius.

Alleged relics of Popes Sylvester I, Stephen I, and Dionysius were exhumed and enshrined beneath the high altar of San Martino ai Monti (founded as Santi Silvestro e Martino ai Monti), in the Esquiline area of Rome. Pope Sylvester I was likely originally buried in San Martino ai Monti, although some sources say his remains were transferred there. An unidentified papal sarcophagus discovered during the demolition of Old Saint Peter's Basilica was attributed to Sylvester I and moved to Nonantola Abbey, near the altar that contains the remains of Pope Adrian III. Other sources describe a combination of Sylvester I and Vigilius in an altar in St. Peter's.

Other relics
The bones of Saints Praxedes and Pudentiana were contained in the catacomb until they were moved in the 9th century by Pope Paschal I to be housed in the rebuilt Santa Prassede.

It is also in this catacomb that the relics of saint Philomena were found.

References

Sources
 Reardon, Wendy J. 2004. The Deaths of the Popes. Macfarland & Company, Inc. 

Priscilla
Papal tombs
Rome Q. XVII Trieste